Masked Avengers may refer to:

Masked Avengers (film), 1981 Hong Kong film directed by Chang Cheh
Masked Avengers (duo), Canadian radio duo known for making prank calls